Andrija Bašić (born 9 September 1995) is a Croatian water polo player. He is currently playing for Greek water polo club NC Vouliagmeni. He is 6 ft 4 in (1.92 m) tall and weighs (203 lb (92 kg).

References

External links

 Vaterpolska reprezentacija u Šibeniku se priprema za svjetsko prvenstvo: Obrana zlata i revanš Srbiji veliki su nam motivi
 Šibenčanin Andrija Bašić odlazi u inozemni klub, Tucak ga uvrstio na popis za Svjetski kup
 ANDRIJA BAŠIĆ Šibenčanin s liste vaterpolskih reprezentativaca o Grčkoj: kriza se tamo ne osjeća; na kavama se sjedi satima!

Living people
1995 births
Sportspeople from Šibenik
Croatian male water polo players